The peseta was a short-lived denomination issued by Peru between 1880 and 1882. The peseta was subdivided into 2 reales, with 5 pesetas equal to 1 sol. The sol continued to be produced during this period and was not replaced by the peseta.

Coins
Silver coins were issued by the Lima mint in 1880 for 1 and 5 pesetas, with further issues of 5 pesetas made in 1881 and 1882 by the Ayacucho mint. A small number of  real coins was minted in 1882, also at the Ayacucho mint.

References

External links

Modern obsolete currencies
Peseta
Economic history of Peru
1880 establishments in Peru
1882 disestablishments in Peru
19th-century economic history